Buxar Assembly constituency is one of the 243 assembly constituencies of Bihar Vidhan Sabha. It comes under Buxar (Lok Sabha constituency) for parliamentary elections. In 2015 Bihar Legislative Assembly election, Buxar will be one of the 36 seats to have VVPAT enabled electronic voting machines.

Parts
This constituency includes Buxar and Chausa blocks of Buxar district.

Members of Legislative Assembly

Election results

2020

References

External links
 

Assembly constituencies of Bihar
Politics of Buxar district